This article is about the demographic features of the population of Kiribati, including population density, ethnicity, education level, health of the populace, economic status, religious affiliations and other aspects of the population.

Population

Statistics 

The following demographic statistics are from the CIA World Factbook, unless otherwise indicated.

Nationality 
 Noun: I-Kiribati (singular and plural forms)
 Adjective: Kiribati or Gilbertese

Ethnic groups 
 I-Kiribati 96.2%, 105,983 
 Mixed/I-Kiribati 1.8% 1,974
 Tuvaluans 0.2% 198
 Others 1.8% 1,981 (2015 census)

Religions 
 Roman Catholic: 57.3%
 Kiribati Uniting Church: 31.3%
 Latter-day Saints: 5.3%
 Baháʼí: 2.1%
 Seventh-day Adventist: 1.9%
 Other: 2.1% (2015 est.)

Languages 
 English (official)
 Gilbertese (official)

Population 
 110,136 (2015 Census)
 119,940 (2020 Census)

Age structure 
 0–14 years: 28.47% (male 16,223, female 15,604)
 15–24 years: 20.24% (male 11,171, female 11,459)
 25–54 years: 40.05% (male 21,530, female 23,249)
 55–64 years: 6.65% (male 3,350, female 4,084)
 65 years and over: 4.59% (male 2,004, female 3,122) (2015 est.)

From 2015 Census:
 0–5 years: 17,466
 6–14 years: 20,962
 15–17 years: 7,089
 18–49 years: 49,972
 + 50 years: 14,637

Median age 
 Average: 23.9 years
 Male: 23.1 years
 Female: 24.8 years (2015 est.)

Population growth rate 
 1.09% (2020 est.)

Birth rate 
 20.5 births/1,000 population (2020 est.)

Death rate 
 6.9 deaths/1,000 population (2020 est.)

Net migration rate 
 -2.8 migrant(s)/1,000 population (2020 est.)

Urbanization 
 Urban population: 55.6% of Total population (2020)
 Rate of urbanization: 1.78% annual rate of change (2010—15 est.)

Sex ratio (male(s) to female) 
 At birth: 1.05
 0–14 years: 1.04
 15–24 years: 0.97
 25–54 years: 0.93
 55–64 years: 0.82
 65 years and over: 0.64
 Total population: 0.94 (2020 est.)

Maternal mortality rate 
 90 deaths/100,000 live births (2015 est.)

Infant mortality rate 
 Total: 34.26 deaths/1,000 live births
 Male: 35.48 deaths/1,000 live births
 Female: 32.99 deaths/1,000 live births (2015 est.)

Life expectancy at birth 
 Total population: 67.5 years
 Male: 65 years
 Female: 70.2 years (2020 est.)

Total fertility rate 
 2.25 children born/woman (2020 est.)
 3.3 (2018–19) - Pacific community

Health expenditure (% of GDP)
 10.8% (2017)

Physicians density 
 0.2 physicians/1,000 population (2013)

Hospital bed density 
 1.9 beds/1,000 population (2015)

Obesity – adult prevalence rate 
 46% (2016)

School life expectancy 
 Male: 11 years
 Female: 12 years (2015 est.)

References